Charmian Mellars (born 7 January 1979 in Papakura, Auckland) is a New Zealand female professional basketball player. She was a member of New Zealand women's national basketball team at the 2008 Beijing Olympics. She scored six points and grabbed two rebounds in the game they played against China, which they were defeated 80-63.

She played as a shooting guard for the Christchurch Sirens in the Women's National Basketball League (WNBL). In 2001 Mellars was named New Zealand's Most Valuable Player in the under 23-year-old category.

Mellars is a member of the Church of Jesus Christ of Latter-day Saints. She is the older sister of fellow New Zealand female professional basketball player and Latter-day Saint Natalie Taylor.

References
 Mormon Times article, 13 August 2008
 

1979 births
Living people
New Zealand Latter Day Saints
New Zealand women's basketball players
Olympic basketball players of New Zealand
Basketball players at the 2008 Summer Olympics
Basketball players at the 2006 Commonwealth Games
Commonwealth Games silver medallists for New Zealand
People from Papakura
Commonwealth Games medallists in basketball
Shooting guards
Medallists at the 2006 Commonwealth Games